The Avon Bottoms Wildlife Area is a tract of protected land located on the border of Illinois in Rock County, Wisconsin, managed by the Wisconsin Department of Natural Resources (WDNR).

History
The Avon Bottoms Wildlife area was established in 1960 as part of a federal wildlife restoration project, specifically to improve duck and pheasant populations in the area to attract hunters.

The area was established with the intention to improve and preserve wildlife and habitat diversity along the Sugar River, a popular destination for kayakers, canoers, and tubers. The preservation of the area has led to the Wisconsin Wetlands Association to declare the floodplain forest a "wetland gem".

The Natural Resources Conservation Service, an agency of the United States Department of Agriculture restored wetlands and grasslands in the area, with 3,100 such acres working as easements directly adjacent to the wildlife area.

Land cover
The main feature of the wildlife area is the bottomland hardwood forest, making up over one third of the total area. There are also many notable examples of large swamp white oak trees in the floodplain areas, mainly in the Avon Bottoms natural area sector. The 1986 WDNR master plan for the Wildlife Area states that some of these trees are near record size, and important to the biodiversity and the environment.

State natural areas

The Avon Bottoms State Natural Area is a unit of the larger wildlife area, and comprises  of mostly floodplain forest. 

In 2016, the State Natural Area Swenson Wet Prairie, designated in 1968, coalesced into the existing Avon Bottoms State Natural Area.

References

External links
 U.S. Geological Survey Map at the U.S. Geological Survey Map Website. Retrieved February 25, 2023.

State Natural Area
State Wildlife Area
Protected areas of Wisconsin
Geography of Rock County, Wisconsin
Protected areas established in 1960